Justus Weigand  is a German field hockey player who plays as a forward for  Mannheimer HC and the Germany national team.

References

External links

2000 births
Living people
German male field hockey players
Field hockey players at the 2020 Summer Olympics
Olympic field hockey players of Germany
Male field hockey forwards
Sportspeople from Nuremberg
Mannheimer HC players
Men's Feldhockey Bundesliga players
2023 Men's FIH Hockey World Cup players
21st-century German people